The 2003 East Asian Football Championship was the 1st edition of the East Asian Football Championship, an international football tournament for East Asian countries and territories organized by the EAFF. The qualifiers were held in February and March 2003 in Hong Kong and the final was held in December 2003 in Japan. South Korea won the inaugural championship.

China PR, South Korea, and Japan were the direct finalists. The fourth finalist spot was competed among Chinese Taipei, Guam, Hong Kong, Macau and Mongolia. Hong Kong won the qualifiers.

Participating teams

Preliminary

Finals
 – 2002 FIFA World Cup participating team
 – Winner of preliminary competition
 – 2002 FIFA World Cup participating team
 – 2002 FIFA World Cup participating team

Venues

Preliminary competition

Finals

Preliminary competition
The Preliminary competition was hosted by Hong Kong. The winner of the group advanced to the finals. North Korea withdrew from the tournament.

All times are local (HKT, UTC+08:00).

Personal awards

Finals

Squads

Matches
All times are local (JST, UTC+09:00).

Final standing

External links
Official Site
East Asian Cup 2003 at Rsssf

2003
2003 in Asian football
2002–03 in Hong Kong football
2003–04 in Hong Kong football
2003 in Chinese football
2003 in Japanese football
2003 in South Korean football
2003
2003